Maddie Coates (born 27 September 1997) is an Australian athlete. She competed in the women's 4 × 100 metres relay event at the 2019 World Athletics Championships.

Coates' highest world ranking to date is in the 200 metres. At the 2018 Commonwealth Games, she finished third in her heat, 0.23 seconds behind world champion Dina Asher-Smith, but failed to make the final.

References

External links
 
 Maddie Coates at Athletics Australia

1997 births
Living people
Australian female sprinters
Place of birth missing (living people)
World Athletics Championships athletes for Australia